Jaylin Bosak (born January 7, 1998) is an American professional soccer player who plays as a defender for Finnish club Åland United

Career 
Bosak started her career as a soccer player at a young age in the clubs of her city.

Bosak attended Millard West High School in Omaha, Nebraska.

She was scouted by the Creighton University trained by the former American international Ross Paule.

She began her career under the orders of the American coach in 2016.

Young career
 2016–2019: Creighton University Women's Team, Omaha (US)

Professional career 
 2019–2021: Sporting Nebraska FC, Omaha (United States)
 2021 : Kuopion Palloseura, Kuopio (Finland)
 2021–2022: F.C. Ramat HaSharon, Ramat HaSharon (Israel)
 2022: Maccabi Kishronot Hadera F.C., Hadera (Israel)
 2022: FF Yzeure Allier Auvergne, Yzeure (France)
 2022-: Åland United, Lemland (Finland)

Personal life 
Bosak is fluent in English, Spanish, and French, and can understand Hebrew.

Honors 
 Best defender: 2018–2019
 Best defender: 2021–2022
 On the top 11 of Finland 2021
 Top 11 of the season
 Best defender of Winter Break 2022

References

External links
 Creighton Bluejays bio

1998 births
Living people
Women's association football defenders
Creighton Bluejays women's soccer players
Soccer players from Nebraska
Sportspeople from Lincoln, Nebraska
Sportspeople from Omaha, Nebraska
American women's soccer players
American expatriate women's soccer players
F.C. Ramat HaSharon players
Ligat Nashim players
Kansallinen Liiga players
Maccabi Kishronot Hadera F.C. players
Division 2 Féminine players
Expatriate footballers in Finland
Expatriate footballers in Israel
Expatriate footballers in France
American expatriate sportspeople in Finland
American expatriate sportspeople in Israel
American expatriate sportspeople in France